Tom Hagen (born 1950) is a Norwegian businessman. In 1992, he co-founded Elkraft AS, an electric company. Hagen works in property development. The financial magazine Kapital lists him as Norway's 172nd richest person.

His wife, Anne-Elisabeth Falkevik Hagen, was supposedly kidnapped on 31 October 2018 and has not been seen since. The suspected kidnappers demanded a nine million euro ransom paid in the cryptocurrency Monero. In June 2019, Norwegian police said that they could not rule out that the alleged abduction had simply been a cover for her death.

On 28 April 2020, he was arrested and charged with murder, or complicity to murder, of his wife Anne-Elisabeth Hagen. However, he was released shortly after he was arrested, though he is still a suspect [as of 2022].

References

1950 births
20th-century Norwegian businesspeople
21st-century Norwegian businesspeople
Date of birth missing (living people)
Living people
Norwegian company founders
Place of birth missing (living people)